Irina Robertovna Turova (later Bochkaryova and Mordovtseva, ; 14 May 1935 – 8 February 2012) was a Soviet sprinter. She placed fourth in the 4×100 m relay at the 1952 and 1956 Summer Olympics and won two gold and one silver medal at the 1954 European Athletics Championships.

Turova was coached by her parents, who competed nationally in various track events, including sprint. Her son Pyotr Bochkaryov became an Olympic pole vaulter.

References 

1935 births
2012 deaths
Athletes (track and field) at the 1952 Summer Olympics
Athletes (track and field) at the 1956 Summer Olympics
Soviet female sprinters
Olympic athletes of the Soviet Union
European Athletics Championships medalists
Olympic female sprinters